Nipun Karunanayake (born 11 January 1991) is a Sri Lankan first-class cricketer who plays for Bloomfield Cricket and Athletic Club. Nipun was educated at Nalanda College, Colombo and captained the first XI team in 2009.

In March 2018, he was named in Dambulla's squad for the 2017–18 Super Four Provincial Tournament. The following month, he was also named in Dambulla's squad for the 2018 Super Provincial One Day Tournament.

In August 2018, he was named in Dambulla's squad the 2018 SLC T20 League.

References

External links
 

1991 births
Living people
Sri Lankan cricketers
Anuradhaura District cricketers
Bloomfield Cricket and Athletic Club cricketers
Cricketers from Colombo
Alumni of Nalanda College, Colombo